Noel Barkley (born 1 March 1961) is a Northern Irish-born former association football player who represented New Zealand at international level.

Career
Barkley began his career in his native Northern Ireland, playing in the Irish League for Larne and Crusaders, before emigrating to New Zealand in February 1983.

Barkley made his full All Whites debut in a 4–2 win over Fiji on 17 September  1986 and ended his international playing career with 20 A-international caps and 5 goals to his credit, his final cap gained in a 0–1 loss to Australia on 12 May 1991.

Barkley won New Zealand Player of the Year award 3 times, in 1989, 1990 and 1992.

Barkely scored 106 National League goals in 180 appearances. He also scored 249 goals in 417 senior appearances for Mt Maunganui, Papatoetoe, Mt Wellington, Newcastle Breakers, Waitakere City FC, Ellerslie and Central.

Honours
National League Golden Boot: 1989, 1992 and 1995
National League Winner: 1992
National League Grand Final Medalist: 1989 (Mt Wellington) 1993 (Waitakere City FC)
Chatham Cup Winner: 1990 (Mt Wellington) & 1994 (Waitakere City FC)
Chatham Cup Runners Up: 1986 (Mt Maunganui)
Auckland Football Association Player of the Year: 1989
Northern League Player of the Year: 1986
Northern League Winner: 1986 (Mt Maunganui)
Country Foods Cup Winner: 1985 (Mt Maunganui)

Stats supplied by football historian Barry Smith

References

External links

1961 births
Living people
Association football defenders
New Zealand association footballers
New Zealand international footballers
National Soccer League (Australia) players
Papatoetoe AFC players
Place of birth missing (living people)
Newcastle Breakers FC players
NIFL Premiership players
Larne F.C. players
Crusaders F.C. players